Grosvenor Park Open Air Theatre holds an eight week annual repertory season in Chester, United Kingdom. The productions are staged in the round, in a purpose built theatre constructed each summer in Grosvenor Park.

The theatre
The company was formed under the name Chester Performs and  staged its first production of Much Ado About Nothing in 2010, using a simple wooden platform stage.

The next year it moved to using a thrust stage format in a horseshoe shaped theatre; the actors performed on a wood chip base flooring. In 2015 the U-shape auditorium was replaced by a full in the round theatre, with terraced seating, some 40% of which is under cover.
 There is a range of seating types, some designed as picnic terraces; picnic hampers and drinks are available.

The theatre is dismantled and rebuilt each year 

in the Victorian Grade II* listed Grosvenor Park. Total seating capacity is 535.

Storyhouse
In 2017  the empty Odeon theatre in Chester was refurbished and opened as a new cultural centre with the name Storyhouse. The name Storyhouse now applies both to the building and the range of activities based there,

which includes the in-house theatrical productions formerly known as Chester Performs.
The Storyhouse company produces all its work in-house under its Artistic Director, Alex Clifton.

Each summer season, the company mounts three productions.  The productions premier in the Storyhouse theatre before moving outside to the Open Air Theatre. The repertoire typically includes two Shakespeare plays and a specially commissioned adaptation of a children's classic. This has included work by Jessica Swale and often by Glyn Maxwell.
Grosvenor Park Open Air Theatre also invites a company of 16- to 24-year-olds to stage an original one-act play which is written, produced and performed by its members.

The theatre is listed by the BBC Countryfile magazine as among the best open air theatres in the country.

Productions
A complete list of past shows is given on the theatre website,

which also maintains a collection of reviews.

References

External links
Grosvenor Park Open Air Theatre
Storyhouse

Outdoor theatres
Theatres in Cheshire
Buildings and structures in Chester